State Road 282 (NM 282) is a  state highway in the US state of New Mexico. NM 282's southern terminus is at NM 516 in Aztec, and the northern terminus is at the Aztec Municipal Airport in Aztec.

Major intersections

See also

References

282
Transportation in San Juan County, New Mexico